Jena (minor planet designation: 526 Jena) is a Themistian asteroid. It was discovered in Heidelberg by the German astronomer Max Wolf on 14 March 1904 and named after the city of Jena.

References

External links
 
 

Themis asteroids
Jena
Jena
B-type asteroids (Tholen)
19040314